In science and engineering, a power level and a field level (also called a root-power level) are logarithmic measures of certain quantities referenced to a standard reference value of the same type.

 A power level is a logarithmic quantity used to measure power, power density or sometimes energy, with commonly used unit decibel (dB).
 A field level (or root-power level) is a logarithmic quantity used to measure quantities of which the square is typically proportional to power (for instance, the square of Voltage is proportional to Power by the inverse of the conductor's Resistance), etc., with commonly used units neper (Np) or decibel (dB).

The type of level and choice of units indicate the scaling of the logarithm of the ratio between the quantity and its reference value, though a logarithm may be considered to be a dimensionless quantity. The reference values for each type of quantity are often specified by international standards.

Power and field levels are used in electronic engineering, telecommunications, acoustics and related disciplines.  Power levels are used for signal power, noise power, sound power, sound exposure, etc.  Field levels are used for voltage, current, sound pressure.

Power level
Level of a power quantity, denoted LP, is defined by

where
P is the power quantity;
P0 is the reference value of P.

Field (or root-power) level
The level of a root-power quantity (also known as a field quantity), denoted LF, is defined by

where
F is the root-power quantity, proportional to the square root of power quantity;
F0 is the reference value of F.

If the power quantity P is proportional to F2, and if the reference value of the power quantity, P0, is in the same proportion to F02, the levels LF and LP are equal.

The neper, bel, and decibel (one tenth of a bel) are units of level that are often applied to such quantities as power, intensity, or gain.  The neper, bel, and decibel are related by
;
.

Standards
Level and its units are defined in ISO 80000-3.

This is motivated by simplifying the expressions involved, as in systems of natural units.

Related quantities

Logarithmic ratio quantity
Power and field quantities are part of a larger class, logarithmic ratio quantities.

ANSI/ASA S1.1-2013 defines a class of quantities it calls levels. It defines a level of a quantity Q, denoted LQ, as

where
r is the base of the logarithm;
Q is the quantity;
Q0 is the reference value of Q.

Logarithmic frequency ratio 
The logarithmic frequency ratio (also "frequency level") of two frequencies is the logarithm of their ratio, and may be expressed using the unit octave (symbol: oct) corresponding to the ratio 2 or the unit decade (symbol: dec) corresponding to the ratio 10.  

In electronics, the octave (oct) is used as a unit with logarithm base 2, and the decade (dec) is used as a unit with logarithm base 10:
 

In music theory, the octave is a unit used with logarithm base 2 (called interval). A semitone is one twelfth of an octave. A cent is one hundredth of a semitone.  In this context, the reference frequency is taken to be C, four octaves below middle C.

See also
 
 Power, root-power, and field quantities
 Logarithmic scale
 Sound level (disambiguation)
 Leveling (tapered floating point)
 Level-index arithmetic (LI) and symmetric level-index arithmetic (SLI)

Notes

References
 
 
 
 
 
 
 
 
 
   (22 pages)
 

Mathematical terminology
Logarithmic scales of measurement